John Noble Barinyima (born 6 June 1993) is a Nigerian footballer who plays as a goalkeeper for Enyimba and the Nigeria national team.

International career 
On 25 December 2021, He was shortlisted in 2021 AFCON Nations Cup by Caretaker Coach Eguavoen as part of the 28-Man Nigeria Squad

References

External links
Player profile - enyimbafc.net

1993 births
Living people
Nigerian footballers
Association football goalkeepers
Enyimba F.C. players